P. Durairaj is an Indian politician and former Member of the Legislative Assembly. He was elected to the Tamil Nadu legislative assembly  from Sankaranayanarkoil constituency in 1967 election as Dravida Munnetra Kazhagam candidate and 1980 election as an Anna Dravida Munnetra Kazhagam candidate.

References 

All India Anna Dravida Munnetra Kazhagam politicians
Possibly living people
Year of birth missing